"United" is a song by British popstar Robbie Williams released as a single in 2000 (in Europe only) as part of Pepsi's "Ask for More" advertising campaign.

The original release includes a remix by English Electronica band Apollo 440. "United" was also released separately as a promo single and as the additional songs for the Robbie Williams single "Supreme", released the same year.

Track listing
 "United" – 5:59 	
 "United" (Apollo 440 Remix) – 5:37 	
 Interview

References

2000 singles
Robbie Williams songs
Songs written by Guy Chambers
Advertising campaigns
PepsiCo advertising campaigns
Song recordings produced by Guy Chambers
Songs written by Robbie Williams
EMI Records singles
2000 songs